Voice of Teen is a singing reality show based in Nepal organized by Super A-One Media Pvt. Ltd. It is a talent hunt for the age group thirteen to nineteen. Season 1 ran in 2009-2010. Voice of Teen - Season 1 has already ended and has already come up with a decision. Bedu Saru Magar is the winner of Season 1.

Finalists 
 Bedu Saru Magar (Winner)
 Akanshya Basyal (1st Runner Up)
 Bikesh K Shankar (2nd Runner Up)
 Suraj Poudel (Top 5)
 Enoc Tamang (Top 5)
 Anubhuti Gurung (Top 8)
 Rajkumar Pakhrin (Top 8)
 Samta Rai (Top 8)
 Ashish Das Diyali (Top 12)
 Shristy Hingmang (Top 12)
 Shova Kafle (Top 12)
 Bina Rani (Top 12)

Jury 
The Jury for season 1 was composed of the following music professionals from the Nepalese Music Industry. 
 Devika Bandana - Singer
 Raju Singh - Music Director
 Ramkrishna Dhakal - Singer

Airing 
There were many time changes on airing schedule of Voice of Teen Season 1. However, it was every Friday 9:30 PM (Nepal Time) on Nepal Television during the later episodes.

Sponsors & partners 
Voice of Teen Season 1 is title sponsored by Hero Honda. Hero Honda sponsored the title winner with a Hero Honda Glamor Motorbike. Similarly Music Nepal was another major sponsor. The winner was awarded a Music Contract of annual worth NRs. 5 Lakhs by Music Nepal. 

Its other supporting partners were
 Triton International College
 Meronepalma.com

Results 
The final results produced were as follows.

External links 
 Voice of Teen - Season 1 (Final Archive Blog)
 Voice of Teen Official Website

2009 Nepalese television seasons
2010 Nepalese television seasons